Scott Thorburn (born 24 January 1977) is an Australian former professional rugby league footballer who played in the 1990s for the South Queensland Crushers and Gold Coast Chargers.

Background
Thorburn was born in the New South Wales town of Taree but played most of his football in Queensland.

Playing career
Thorburn made one appearance for South Queensland in the 1997 ARL season, then nine for Gold Coast in the 1998 NRL season including the club's final ever game in first grade which was a 20-18 defeat against Cronulla.

While playing for Easts Tigers, Thorburn won the Queensland Cup's best and fairest award in the 2002 season. His post NRL career also included a stint in England with the Hull Kingston Rovers.

Post playing
Formerly a fireman by trade, Thornburn is based in Mackay, Queensland.

References

External links
Scott Thorburn at Rugby League project

1977 births
Living people
Australian rugby league players
Eastern Suburbs Tigers players
Gold Coast Chargers players
Hull Kingston Rovers players
Rugby league five-eighths
Rugby league halfbacks
Rugby league players from Taree
South Queensland Crushers players